Guyer is a surname. Notable people with the surname include:

 Adolf Guyer-Zeller (1839–1899), Swiss entrepreneur
 Brandon Guyer (born 1986), American professional baseball outfielder
 Charlie Guyer (1909–1977), Australian rules footballer
 Cindy Guyer (born 1961), American model and actress
 Denis Guyer (born 1966), American politician
 Gino Guyer (born 1983), American professional ice hockey centre
 Gordon Guyer (born 1926), president of Michigan State University from 1992 to 1993
 Irving Guyer (1916-2012), American painter
 Jane I. Guyer, George Armstrong Kelly Professor in the Department of Anthropology at The Johns Hopkins University
 Josh Guyer (born 1994), Australian professional baseball pitcher 
 Léonie Guyer (born 1955), contemporary American artist
 Lisa Guyer (1963) American singer, guitarist, and songwriter
 Lux Guyer (1894–1955), Swiss architect
 Michael F. Guyer (1874–1959), American cytologist and zoologist
 Mike Guyer (born 1958), member of the architectural firm Gigon/Guyer
 Murphy Guyer (born 1952), American actor, playwright, writer and director
 Paul Guyer, Jonathan Nelson Professor of Philosophy at Brown University
 Percy Guyer, pseudonym of songwriter Septimus Winner
 Roy J. Guyer (1885–1956), American college athlete and coach
 Reyn Guyer (born 1935), American inventor of Twister
 Tennyson Guyer (1913–1981), member of the United States House of Representatives
 Thad McIntosh Guyer (born 1950), American civil rights lawyer
 U. S. Guyer (1868–1943), U.S. Representative from Kansas

Other uses
 Dowleh Guyer, a village in Iran